Thomas Roderick Heeps (7 March 1938 – 20 November 2002) was a New Zealand rugby union player who played ten matches for the New Zealand national team, the All Blacks, including five tests, in 1962.

References

1938 births
2002 deaths
New Zealand international rugby union players
New Zealand rugby union players
Wellington rugby union players
Rugby union players from Hamilton, New Zealand
Rugby union wings
People educated at Mount Albert Grammar School